Gabrielle Seymour (born 28 October 1996) is an Australian rules footballer playing for the Richmond Football Club in the AFL Women's (AFLW). Seymour signed with Richmond as a rookie during the 2019 rookie signing period in July. She made her debut against  at Ikon Park in the opening round of the 2020 season.

Statistics
Statistics are correct to the end of the 2020 season.

|- style="background-color: #eaeaea"
! scope="row" style="text-align:center" | 2020
|style="text-align:center;"|
| 28 || 6 || 0 || 0 || 23 || 19 || 42 || 10 || 16 || 0.0 || 0.0 || 3.8 || 3.2 || 7.0 || 1.7 || 2.7
|- 
|- class="sortbottom"
! colspan=3| Career
! 6
! 0
! 0
! 23
! 19
! 42
! 10
! 16
! 0.0
! 0.0
! 3.8
! 3.2
! 7.0
! 1.7
! 2.7
|}

References

External links 

1996 births
Living people
Richmond Football Club (AFLW) players
Australian rules footballers from Victoria (Australia)